The Palpable Leprosy of Pollution is the debut studio album by the English deathcore band Infant Annihilator. It was released on 12 December 2012. The album is Infant Annihilator's only album to feature former vocalist Dan Watson, who departured from the band in 2013.

Track listing

Personnel 
Infant Annihilator

 Dan Watson – vocals, lyrics
 Eddie Pickard – guitar, bass
 Aaron Kitcher – drums

References 

2012 albums
Infant Annihilator albums